Olhyne is a village in Beryslav Raion (district) in Kherson Oblast of southern Ukraine, at about  northeast by north from the centre of Kherson city. It belongs to Vysokopillia settlement hromada, one of the hromadas of Ukraine.

The settlement came under attack by Russian forces during the Russian invasion of Ukraine in 2022.

Demographics
The settlement had 419 inhabitants in 2001; native language distribution as of the Ukrainian Census of the same year:
Ukrainian: 75.45%
Russian: 22.51%

References

Villages in Beryslav Raion